Arothron caeruleopunctatus, also known as the blue-spotted pufferfish, is a demersal marine fish belonging to the family Tetraodontidae.

Description
Arothron caeruleopunctatus is a medium-sized fish which grows up to 80 cm length. Its body is oval shape, spherical et relatively elongated. The skin is not covered with scales. The fish has no pelvic fin and no lateral line. The dorsal fin and the anal fin are small, symmetric and located at the end of the body. Its snout is short with two pairs of nostrils and its mouth is terminal with four strong teeth.

Its body colors and patterns are variable but the background coloration is blue grey except the ventral part which is whitish, a yellowish blotch with an extremely irregular size and outline covers the dorsal part. The body is also studded with bluish to white spots in rice shape and the eyes are circled with concentric lines.

Distribution and habitat
This species is found in tropical and subtropical waters from the oceanic islands of the Indian Ocean to the western Pacific Ocean. It lives on the external slopes of rocky or coral reefs from the surface to 25 m depth.

Feeding
Arothron caeruleopunctatus feeds on benthic invertebrates.

Behaviour
This pufferfish is active in the daytime, and is solitary and shy.

References

External links
http://www.marinespecies.org/aphia.php?p=taxdetails&id=219922
http://eol.org/pages/2805951/details
http://doris.ffessm.fr/fiche2.asp?fiche_numero=1524
http://www.fishbase.org/summary/13051
 

Fish of Thailand
caeruleopunctatus
Fish described in 1994
Taxa named by Keiichi Matsuura